Debapriya Bhattacharya is an economist and public policy analyst from Bangladesh. He was the first executive director of Centre for Policy Dialogue in Dhaka. He also worked as a senior research fellow at Bangladesh Institute of Development Studies (BIDS).

Early life
Bhattacharya's father, Debesh Bhattacharya, was a lawmaker. He served as a Supreme Court jurist. Bhattacharya's mother, Chitra Bhattacharya, was a member of parliament of the Government of Bangladesh during 1996 to 2001. Bhattacharya attended St Gregory's High School and Dhaka College. He earned his MSc and PhD in economics at the Plekhanov Institute of the National Economy, Moscow.

Career
Bhattacharya served as an executive director of the Centre for Policy Dialogue (CPD). In 2007 Bhattacharya was  appointed Ambassador and Permanent Representative of Bangladesh to the WTO and UN Office in Geneva. A year later he resigned from the post citing "moral and ethical grounds".

Publications

Books (Editor/Co-Editor/Co-Authors)

Bhattacharya, D., et al, 2022. Data for Policymaking in the Pandemic Period: The Bangladesh Experience. Dhaka: Centre for Policy Dialogue (CPD)

Bhattacharya, D. (Ed). 2019. Bangladesh's Graduation from the Least Developed Countries Group; Pitfalls and Promises. London: Routledge.

Bhattacharya, D. and Ordonez A. (Eds.). 2016. Southern Perspectives on the Post-2015 International Development Agenda. London: Routledge.

Bhattacharya, D. and Mikic, M. 2015. Least Developed Countries and Trade: Challenges of Implementing the Bali Package. UN ESCAP.

Bhattacharya, D., Jahan, S. 2020. Global State of SDGs-Three Layers of Critical Action: Southern Voice. http://southernvoice.org/state-of-the-sdgs/

Research Papers/ Book Chapters

Bhattacharya, D., Gonsior, V. and Öhler, H. (2021). The Implementation of the SDGs: The Feasibility of Using the GPEDC Monitoring Framework. In the book titled, “The Palgrave Handbook of development cooperation for achieving the 2030 Agenda: contested collaboration”. Singapore: Springer.

Bhattacharya, D., Khan, S.S. (2020, April 30). Rethinking Development Effectiveness: Perspectives from the Global South. http://southernvoice.org/rethinking-development-effectiveness-perspectives-from-the-global-south/.

Working Paper

Bhattacharya, D., Khan, T.I. and Khan, S.S. (2021). Are we asking the right questions? Choices and Challenges in Assessing COVID-19 Impact on the Vulnerable in Bangladesh. Dhaka: Citizen’s Platform for SDGs, Bangladesh.

Blogs

Bhattacharya, D., and Jannat, M. (2022). Three thoughts on the graduating Commonwealth LDCs. OECD Development Matters. 11 May.

Bhattacharya, D. and Khan, S.S. (2021). Post-COVID world discourse: four fault lines. On Think Tanks. 11 January.

Bhattacharya, D. and Khan, S.S. (2021). Removing the Wedge between Process Actors and Knowledge Actors in Development Cooperation: A Step toward More Inclusive and Networked Global Governance. Center for Global Development (CGD). 14 June.

Bhattacharya, D., Islam, R. F. (2020). Least Developed Countries Confronting COVID-19: Response and Resilience. United Nations Office for the South-South Cooperation. https://www.southsouth-galaxy.org/covid-19/article-on-least-developed-countries-confronting-covid-19-response-and-resilience/.

Bhattacharya, D., Islam, R. F. (2020). The COVID-19 Scourge: How affected are the Least Developed Countries? OECD Development Matters. https://oecd-development-matters.org/2020/04/23/the-covid-19-scourge-how-affected-are-the-least-developed-countries/

Bhattacharya, D., Khan, S.S. (2020). COVID-19: A game changer for the Global South and international co-operation? OECD Development Matters.  https://oecd-development-matters.org/2020/09/02/covid-19-a-game-changer-for-the-global-south-and-international-co-operation/

Opeds

Bhattacharya, D. (2021, 29 August). পিছিয়ে পড়া মানুষ কতটুকু সুফল পাচ্ছে. Samakal.

Bhattacharya, D. (2021, 27 July). Intellectual property rights issues must be embedded in Bangladesh’s LDC graduation strategy. The Financial Express.

Bhattacharya, D. (2021, 4 June). বাজেটে মহামারি পরিস্থিতির প্রতিফলন নেই. Samakal.

Bhattacharya, D. (2021, 4 June). অতিমারির বাস্তবতা উঠে আসেনি. Prothom Alo.

Bhattacharya, D. (2021, 3 June). Glimpses from our national budget history. The Financial Express.

Bhattacharya, D. and Hossain, M. (2021, 28 May). Unpacking the Covid-19 stimulus packages: The devil is in the details. The Daily Star.

Bhattacharya, D. (2021, 4 May). Direct cash transfer needed for the poor. The Business Standard.

Bhattacharya, D., Khan, T.I., Bari, E. Chowdhury, F.S. and Khan, S.S. (2021, 27 April). Marginalised communities dealing with the COVID-19 fallouts. The Daily Star.

Bhattacharya, D. (2021, 21 April). Life after LDC Graduation: How is Bangladesh poised for EU GSP+? The Business Standard.

Bhattacharya, D. (2021, 26 March). সংস্কার এখন সময়ের দাবি. Manabzamin.

Bhattacharya, D. (2021, 11 March). Bangladesh qualifies for LDC graduation: What next? The Financial Express.

Bhattacharya, D. (2021, 28 February). উচ্ছ্বাস আছে, উদ্যম রাখতে হবে. Prothom Alo.

Bhattacharya, D. (2021, 26 February). টেকসই উত্তরণে চাই কার্যকর কৌশল. Samakal.

Bhattacharya, D. (2021, 21 February). সাদা-কালো টাকার এই অন্যায় খেলা শেষ হতে হবে. Samakal.

Bhattacharya, D. (2021, 20 January). LDC graduation: Sophie’s Choice? The Business Standard.

Bhattacharya, D. (2021, 14 January). এলডিসি থেকে উত্তরণের সময় পেছানো যৌক্তিক. Prothom Alo.

Bhattacharya, D. (2021, 1 January). বাংলাদেশ অভিজ্ঞতার নিরিখে, প্রত্যাশার আলোকে. Samakal.

References

Living people
Bengali Hindus
Bangladeshi Hindus
Bangladeshi economists
Dhaka College alumni
Year of birth missing (living people)